Stone Haven was a railroad station on the Dedham Branch spur, connecting Dedham station to the main Boston-Providence line at Readville. The station was located on Mount Vernon Street in Dedham, next to the home of Col. Eliphalet Stone, and was named for him. Stone donated the building for the waiting room. It closed on April 21, 1967.

See also
History of rail in Dedham, Massachusetts

References

Former MBTA stations in Massachusetts
Railway stations closed in 1967
Buildings and structures in Dedham, Massachusetts
Dedham Branch
Stations along Boston and Providence Railroad lines
Railway stations in Dedham, Massachusetts
History of Dedham, Massachusetts